The Stizini are a tribe of small to large-sized sand wasps, similar to those in the tribe Bembicini, distinguished primarily by features of wing venation. Members of the genus Stizus are large, and superficially resemble cicada-killer wasps (genus Sphecius, in the related tribe Gorytini), and members of the genus Stizoides are cleptoparasites in the nests of other Crabronids.

References 

Crabronidae
Hymenoptera tribes
Biological pest control wasps